Uropterygius golanii is a moray eel found in the western Indian Ocean, in the northern Red Sea. It is grayish-brown in colour.

References

golanii
Fish described in 1997